Karen Melchior (born 15 October 1980) is a Danish lawyer and politician, formerly of the Danish Social Liberal Party, who has been serving as a Member of the European Parliament since 2019.

Political career

Career in local politics
Melchior was a member of the Copenhagen Municipal Council. In the council, she served on the Social Committee and the Health and Care Committee. from local elections of 2017, on the ticket of the Social Liberal Party.

Melchior ran on the Danish Social Liberal Party's ticket in the European Parliament Election of 2014, where she was elected to the position of first alternate MEP for the party.

Member of the European Parliament, 2019–present
Melchior was eventually elected to the European Parliament in 2019. She has since been serving on the Committee on Legal Affairs and on the Committee on Women's Rights and Gender Equality.

In addition to her committee assignments, Melchior is part of the parliament's delegations to the EU-Armenia Parliamentary Partnership Committee, the EU-Azerbaijan Parliamentary Cooperation Committee and the EU-Georgia Parliamentary Association Committee, as well as to the Euronest Parliamentary Assembly. She is also a member of the European Parliament Intergroup on Anti-Corruption, the European Parliament Intergroup on LGBT Rights, the European Internet Forum, the Responsible Business Conduct Working Group, and the Spinelli Group.

Melchior resigned from the Social Liberal Party in August 2022 but remains a member of the European Parliament.

Harassment of employees 
In 2021, it was revealed how Melchior on several occasions harassed her assistants in her office in the European Parliament. At least three of her assistants ended up on sick leave due to the harassment. In May 2022, her Danish party Danish Social Liberal Party requested her to resign from the European Parliament immediately and declared that she will not be allowed to run for the party for the next election to the European Parliament.

References 

1980 births
Living people
MEPs for Denmark 2019–2024
21st-century women MEPs for Denmark
Politicians from Copenhagen
21st-century Copenhagen City Council members
Danish Social Liberal Party MEPs